Radio Sessions is a compilation album of recordings made by the British band Curve during their two sessions for John Peel's show on the UK broadcasting station Radio 1.

Track listing
"Ten Little Girls" - 4:42
"No Escape From Heaven" - 4:47
"The Colour Hurts" - 3:48
"Coast is Clear" - 4:14
"Die Like a Dog" - 4:35
"Horror Head" - 3:30
"Arms Out" - 4:46
"Split into Fractions" - 4:47

Tracks 1 to 4 were recorded on March 10, 1991, broadcast on March 30, 1991, and produced by Dale Griffin.
Tracks 5 to 8 were recorded on February 11, 1992, broadcast on February 23, 1992, and produced by Mike Robinson.

References

Peel Sessions recordings
Curve (band) compilation albums
1993 live albums
1993 compilation albums